Crooked is Kristin Hersh's eighth studio album, produced by Hersh. The album was released in the form of a book containing song lyrics, artwork and a code to download the music digitally.

In 2019, the album was re-released by Fire Records in both vinyl and cd formats, to mark the 10th anniversary of its original release. In these re-editions, the song order has been altered, with "Moan", "Sand" and "Glass" now the first three tracks, and "Mississippi Kite" becoming track #4.

Track listing

Personnel 
 Kristin Hersh – all vocals and instruments

Production 
 Producer: Kristin Hersh
 Recorded and Mixed by Steve Rizzo
 Mastering: Joe Gastwirt
 Design: Jesse von Doom

References

External links 
 CASH music Crooked page

2010 albums
Kristin Hersh albums